Bellaire is an unincorporated community in White Bear Township, Ramsey County, Minnesota, United States.

The community is located on the south shore of White Bear Lake, and is completely surrounded by the cities of White Bear Lake and Birchwood Village.

See also
 Birchwood Village
 White Bear Township
 White Bear Lake

References

Unincorporated communities in Ramsey County, Minnesota
Unincorporated communities in Minnesota